Family with sequence similarity 106 member A is a protein that in humans is encoded by the FAM106A gene.

References

Further reading